The Bailey JPX D330 is a British paramotor that was designed and produced by Bailey Aviation of Bassingbourn, Royston for powered paragliding. Now out of production, when it was available the aircraft was supplied complete and ready-to-fly.

Design and development
The JPX D330 was designed to comply with the US FAR 103 Ultralight Vehicles rules as well as European regulations. It features a paraglider-style wing, single-place accommodation and a single de-rated  JPX D330 engine in pusher configuration with a 2.38:1 ratio reduction drive and a  diameter three-bladed composite German Helix-Carbon propeller. The de-rated engine is to ensure smooth operation. The aircraft backpack chassis is built so that it can be quickly disassembled into five parts for ground transport and storage.

As is the case with all paramotors, take-off and landing is accomplished by foot. Inflight steering is accomplished via handles that actuate the canopy brakes, creating roll and yaw.

Specifications (JPX D330)

References

JPX D330
2000s British ultralight aircraft
Single-engined pusher aircraft
Paramotors